Neshanic Station is an unincorporated community located within Branchburg and extending into Hillsborough Township, Somerset County, New Jersey, United States. In 2016 most of the village was listed on the National Register of Historic Places as the Neshanic Station Historic District.

Demographics

History
Neshanic Station comes from the Algonquian language meaning "double stream," and the community featured a station along the defunct South Branch Railroad, later a branch of the Central Railroad of New Jersey. The Lehigh Line of Norfolk Southern Railway (formerly the Lehigh Valley Railroad) still runs on tracks north of the community. Neshanic Station is situated at a latitude of 40.508N and a longitude of -74.73W.  It is in the Eastern Standard Time Zone with an elevation of 92 feet.

The South Branch Raritan River passes east of the community. The Elm Street Bridge is a lenticular truss bridge that carries Elm Street (Somerset County Route 667) over the river out of the community to River Road (CR 567).

Historic district

The Neshanic Station Historic District is a historic district encompassing the village. The district was added to the National Register of Historic Places on February 8, 2016 for its significance in community development from 1857 to 1940. It includes 94 contributing buildings and 5 contributing structures.

Gallery

Points of interest 
Neshanic Mills, also listed on the NRHP, is one of the last remaining grist mills along the South Branch Raritan River.

Notable people

People who were born in, residents of, or otherwise closely associated with Neshanic Station include:
 Frank Chapot (1932–2016), Olympic silver medalist equestrian.
 Anthony Gargiulo (born 1984). defensive end who played in the Canadian Football League for the Calgary Stampeders.

See also
Neshanic, New Jersey

References

External links

Branchburg, New Jersey
Hillsborough Township, New Jersey
Unincorporated communities in Somerset County, New Jersey
Unincorporated communities in New Jersey
National Register of Historic Places in Somerset County, New Jersey
Historic districts on the National Register of Historic Places in New Jersey
New Jersey Register of Historic Places